Folk Catholicism can be broadly described as various ethnic expressions and practices of Catholicism intermingled with aspects of folk religion. Practices have varied from place to place, and may at times contradict the official doctrines and practices of the Roman Catholic Church as well as overall Christianity.

Description
Some forms of folk Catholic practices are based on syncretism with non-Catholic or non-Christian beliefs or religions. Some of these folk Catholic forms have come to be identified as separate religions, as is the case with Caribbean and Brazilian syncretisms between Catholicism and West African religions, which include Haitian Vodou, Cuban Santería, and Brazilian Candomblé.

Similarly complex syncretisms between Catholic practice and indigenous or Native American belief systems, as are common in Maya communities of Guatemala and Quechua communities of Peru to give just two examples, are typically not named as separate religions; their practitioners generally regard themselves as good Catholics even while worshiping non-Christian gods.

Other folk Catholic practices are local elaborations of Catholic custom which do not contradict Catholic doctrine and practice. Examples include compadrazgo in modern Iberia, Latin America and the Philippines, which developed from standard medieval European Catholic practices that fell out of favor in Europe after the seventeenth century; the veneration of some local saints, and pilgrimages in medieval and modern Europe. Folk Catholic practices occur where Catholicism is a major religion, not only in the often-cited cases of Latin America and the West Indies. Folk accommodations between Catholicism and local beliefs can be found in Gaelic Scotland, the Philippines, Ireland, Spain, Portugal, France, Italy, Poland, and southern India.

In Ireland, openly Catholic worship was banned due to the Penal Laws. This led to storytellers inventing their own tales so as to teach the Gospel or add further lessons. These further lessons however often ended up contradicting the teaching of the Catholic Church. Within these stories a variety of recurring characters and themes appear such as the Virgin Mary, priests, Paul the Apostle, Satan and Jesus himself.

In the Philippines, the custom of Simbang Gabi developed from the farming community. Simbang Gabi is a devotional nine-day series of Masses leading up to Christmas. On the last day of the Simbang Gabi, which is Christmas Eve, the service is instead called Misa de Gallo (Spanish for "Rooster's Mass"). It has an important role in Philippine culture. It has its origins in the early days of Spanish rule over the Philippines as a practical compromise for farmers, who began work before sunrise to avoid the noonday heat out in the fields. Despite being exhausted by a long day's labor, the people would still attend the customary evening novenas. In 1669, the priests began to say Mass in the early mornings instead of the evening novenas more common in the rest of the Hispanic world. This cherished Christmas custom eventually became a distinct feature of Philippine culture and became a symbol of sharing.

The Roman Catholic Church takes a pragmatic and patient stance towards folk Catholicism. For example, it may permit pilgrimages to the site of reported apparitions (e.g. Međugorje) without endorsing or condemning belief in the reported apparitions, and will often declare Marian apparitions and similar miracles "worthy of belief" (e.g. Our Lady of Fatima), or will confirm the cult of local saints without actually endorsing or recommending belief. When the Roman Catholic Church considers that there is a blatant heresy occurring, it actively rejects it and tells Catholics to stay away from such practices. This is the case of the cult of Santa Muerte (Saint Death, a personification and veneration of death). The Church has condemned the cult as blasphemous, calling it a "degeneration of religion".

Popular Catholicism in the world

Haiti 

One of the biggest and well-known folk religions is Vodou. Vodou and the African slave trade go hand-in-hand. It wouldn't exist without the long history of the pain and suffering of slavery in the western world.[cite needed] 

Vodou has a rich history full of culture, color, magic, zombies and more. It first appeared in Haiti in the 17th century and has grown to a large religion which has over 60 million worshippers. 

It began in tribal regions of the Dahomey Kingdom which is near present-day Nigeria.

Vodu is from the Fon language of Dahomey and means 'god' or 'spirit.' Because of its isolation in the area, Vodu grew quickly and was the religion for many people in this part of West Africa. It is also the origination of the rhythmic drum beating which became a big part of worship and lwa.

Once they arrived in Haiti, the enslaved people's beliefs became a religion, but their enslavers did not allow worship of anything but Christianity. Many enslaved people were even baptized. In order to continue worship, they adopted Catholic saints and traditions. The saints became stand-ins for their lwa; St. Peter, for instance, was Legba. In this manner, they were able to practice their faith and please the enslaver at the same time.

Italy 

In Italy, the spread of popular Catholicism is due to three main factors:

 the regional sense of belonging to the Catholic Church, which has its headquarters in Italy;
 diffuse traditional forms of devotion towards Jesus, Madonnas, angels, saints and patrons that are present in every Italian region and linked to sanctuaries, symbols, relics and religious holidays;
 the charitable and cultural activities of local Catholic aggregations.

Events that contributed to the formation of popular Italian Catholicism include the Counter-Reformation, the Council of Trent, and then the social and civil commitment of the Catholic movement between the nineteenth and twentieth centuries.

Among the most popular saints and patrons in Italy are San Pio (Padre Pio), Saint Anthony of Padua, Saint Francis of Assisi (San Francesco), Santa Rita of Cascia, St. Joseph, St. Michael, Mother Teresa, Saint Clare of Assisi, Saint Rosalia, Januarius, St. Agatha, St. Ambrose, and St. Catherine of Siena. Simon of Trent is also amongst popular figures of italian folk catholicism. 

To the Italian peasantry, the presence of the sacred was associated with rites of traditional magic called benedicaria.

Philippines 

In the Philippines, among the most relevant celebration of popular Catholicism is the novena Christmas known as Simbang Gabi, which arose within the farming community and consists of a nine-day devotional gesture of masses in preparation for Christmas. On the last day of Simbang Gabi, which coincides with Christmas Eve, the most important service is held, called in Spanish Misa de Gallo ("Mass of the Rooster").

This is an ancient tradition celebrated since 1669, brought to the Philippines by Spanish missionaries: originally, the nine masses were held very early in the morning, because most of the country's inhabitants were farmers who had to go to work before dawn, to avoid being in the fields during the hottest hours of the day.

While evening novenas were more common in the rest of the Hispanic world, this Christmas custom eventually became a distinctive feature of Philippine culture and a symbol of shared participation of popular faith.

See also

 Folk Orthodoxy 
 Popular piety

References

Footnotes

Bibliography

External links